The 1989–90 QMJHL season was the 21st season in the history of the Quebec Major Junior Hockey League. The league inaugurates five new awards for accomplishments during the season. Shell Canada sponsored two Shell Cup "Player of the Year" awards, one each for offensive and defensive players. Transamerica sponsors the Transamerica Plaque for the player with the best plus/minus totals. The creates its first award specifically for team builders, the John Horman Trophy for the "Executive of the Year." Finally, the Paul Dumont Trophy is awarded to anyone involved with the league, as the "Personality of the Year."

Eleven teams played 70 games each in the schedule. The Victoriaville Tigres finished first overall in the regular season, winning their first Jean Rougeau Trophy. The President's Cup final was a rematch of the previous season, with the Laval Titan, winning a second consecutive title, defeating Victoriaville in four games.

Team changes
 The Saint-Jean Castors are renamed the Saint-Jean Lynx.
 The Verdun Junior Canadiens relocate to Saint-Hyacinthe, Quebec, becoming the Saint-Hyacinthe Laser.

Final standings
Note: GP = Games played; W = Wins; L = Losses; T = Ties; PTS = Points; GF = Goals for; GA = Goals against

complete list of standings.

Scoring leaders
Note: GP = Games played; G = Goals; A = Assists; Pts = Points; PIM = Penalties in Minutes

 complete scoring statistics

Playoffs
Denis Chalifoux was the leading scorer of the playoffs with 28 points (14 goals, 14 assists).

Division semifinals
 Victoriaville Tigres defeated Chicoutimi Saguenéens 4 games to 3.
 Saint-Hyacinthe Laser defeated Trois-Rivières Draveurs 4 games to 3.
 Hull Olympiques defeated Longueuil Collège Français 4 games to 3.
 Laval Titan defeated Shawinigan Cataractes 4 games to 2.

Division Finals
 Victoriaville Tigres defeated Saint-Hyacinthe Laser 4 games to 1.
 Laval Titan defeated Hull Olympiques 4 games to 0.

Finals
 Laval Titan defeated Victoriaville Tigres 4 games to 0.

All-star teams
First team
 Goaltender - Pierre Gagnon, Victoriaville Tigres
 Left defence - Karl Dykhuis, Hull Olympiques  
 Right defence - Claude Barthe, Victoriaville Tigres 
 Left winger - Patrick Lebeau, Victoriaville Tigres  
 Centreman - Andrew McKim, Hull Olympiques  
 Right winger - Martin Lapointe, Laval Titan     
 Coach - Guy Chouinard, Victoriaville Tigres

Second team
 Goaltender - Felix Potvin, Chicoutimi Saguenéens    
 Left defence - Francois Groleau, Shawinigan Cataractes   
 Right defence - Patrice Brisebois, Laval Titan
 Left winger - Pierre Sevigny, Saint-Hyacinthe Laser
 Centreman - Steve Larouche, Trois-Rivières Draveurs
 Right winger - Sylvain Naud, Laval Titan
 Coach - Gerard Gagnon, Longueuil Collège Français

Rookie team
 Goaltender - Martin Brodeur, Saint-Hyacinthe Laser
 Left defence - Eric Lavigne, Hull Olympiques 
 Right defence - Yan Arsenault, Longueuil Collège Français
 Left winger - Patrick Poulin, Saint-Hyacinthe Laser 
 Centreman - Charles Poulin, Saint-Hyacinthe Laser
 Right winger - Robert Guillet, Longueuil Collège Français
 Coach - Norman Flynn, Saint-Hyacinthe Laser

List of First/Second/Rookie team all-stars

Trophies and awards
Team
President's Cup - Playoff Champions, Laval Titan
Jean Rougeau Trophy - Regular Season Champions, Victoriaville Tigres
Robert Lebel Trophy - Team with best GAA, Victoriaville Tigres

Player
Michel Brière Memorial Trophy - Most Valuable Player, Andrew McKim, Hull Olympiques
Jean Béliveau Trophy - Top Scorer, Patrick Lebeau, Victoriaville Tigres  
Guy Lafleur Trophy - Playoff MVP, Denis Chalifoux, Laval Titan
Shell Cup – Offensive - Offensive Player of the Year, Patrick Lebeau, Victoriaville Tigres 
Shell Cup – Defensive - Defensive Player of the Year, Pierre Gagnon, Victoriaville Tigres
Transamerica Plaque - Best plus/minus total, Martin St. Amour, Trois-Rivières Draveurs 
Jacques Plante Memorial Trophy - Best GAA, Pierre Gagnon, Victoriaville Tigres
Emile Bouchard Trophy - Defenceman of the Year, Claude Barthe, Victoriaville Tigres 
Mike Bossy Trophy - Best Pro Prospect, Karl Dykhuis, Hull Olympiques 
Michel Bergeron Trophy - Offensive Rookie of the Year, Martin Lapointe, Laval Titan   
Raymond Lagacé Trophy - Defensive Rookie of the Year, Francois Groleau, Shawinigan Cataractes
Frank J. Selke Memorial Trophy - Most sportsmanlike player, Andrew McKim, Hull Olympiques 
Marcel Robert Trophy - Best Scholastic Player, Yanic Perreault, Trois-Rivières Draveurs 
Paul Dumont Trophy - Personality of the Year, Stephane Fiset, Victoriaville Tigres

Executive
John Horman Trophy - Executive of the Year, Michel "Bunny" Larocque, Victoriaville Tigres

See also
1990 Memorial Cup
1990 NHL Entry Draft
1989–90 OHL season
1989–90 WHL season

References
 Official QMJHL Website
 www.hockeydb.com/

Quebec Major Junior Hockey League seasons
QMJHL